The City University of New York (CUNY) system is the public university system of New York City.  CUNY consists of 11 senior colleges, 7 community colleges,1 honors college and 7 postgraduate institutions. , CUNY is the United States' largest urban public university, with an enrollment of over 274,000 students.

CUNY and the State University of New York (SUNY) are different university systems, despite the fact that both are public institutions that receive funding from the state of New York. The 64 SUNY and 25 CUNY campus institutions are part of University of the State of New York (USNY). USNY is the governmental umbrella organization for most education-related institutions and many education-related personnel (both public and private) in the state of New York, and which includes, as a component, the New York State Education Department.

All of these schools are accredited by the Middle States Association of Colleges and Schools, in addition to other program-specific accreditations held by individual campuses, such as Association to Advance Collegiate Schools of Business and Association of Collegiate Business Schools and Programs.

History

CUNY's history dates back to the formation of the Free Academy in 1847 by Townsend Harris. The school was fashioned as "a Free Academy for the purpose of extending the benefits of education gratuitously to persons who have been pupils in the common schools of the … city and county of New York". The Free Academy later became the City College of New York, the oldest institution among the CUNY colleges. From this grew a system of seven senior colleges, four hybrid schools, six community colleges, as well as graduate schools and professional programs. CUNY was established in 1961 as the umbrella institution encompassing the municipal colleges and a new graduate school.

Over the years, the configuration of the institutions of CUNY has changed.  The current College of Staten Island, the largest CUNY school by land area, is the result of a merger between Richmond College (upper-division college founded in 1965) and Staten Island Community College (lower-division college founded in 1955).  Lehman College was formerly a branch campus of Hunter College that was known as Hunter-in-the-Bronx.

The City College is the oldest institution of CUNY, having been founded in 1847. Established in 2018, the School of Labor and Urban Studies is the newest addition to the University.

Institutions

Notes
  Each college's founding year is linked to the category of all schools founded in that year
  Enrollment and Gender ratio data not provided for these units.

References

External links

CUNY website

New York, CUNY
Education in New York City
New York State Education Department
City University of New York
New York, CUNY